The 1919 Boston Red Sox season was the 19th season in the franchise's Major League Baseball history. The Red Sox finished sixth in the American League (AL) with a record of 66 wins and 71 losses,  games behind the Chicago White Sox. The team played its home games at Fenway Park.

While World War I had ended in November 1918, players who had been drafted returned gradually during 1919. The season was shortened from 154 to 140 games and did not begin until mid-April, with the Red Sox playing their first game on April 23.

Regular season 
In his last year playing for the Red Sox, Babe Ruth had his breakout offensive season having been converted into an outfielder. He set a major league record with 29 home runs and also led the league in runs batted in and runs scored. Ruth also made 15 pitching starts, going 9–5 with a 2.97 earned run average.

Season standings

Record vs. opponents

Opening Day lineup

Roster

Player stats

Batting

Starters by position 
Note: Pos = Position; G = Games played; AB = At bats; H = Hits; Avg. = Batting average; HR = Home runs; RBI = Runs batted in

Other batters 
Note: G = Games played; AB = At bats; H = Hits; Avg. = Batting average; HR = Home runs; RBI = Runs batted in

Pitching

Starting pitchers 
Note: G = Games pitched; IP = Innings pitched; W = Wins; L = Losses; ERA = Earned run average; SO = Strikeouts

Other pitchers 
Note: G = Games pitched; IP = Innings pitched; W = Wins; L = Losses; ERA = Earned run average; SO = Strikeouts

Relief pitchers 
Note: G = Games pitched; W = Wins; L = Losses; SV = Saves; ERA = Earned run average; SO = Strikeouts

Awards and honors

League top five finishers 
Sam Jones
 #2 losses (20)

Babe Ruth
 #1 home runs (29)
 #1 runs batted in (114)
 #1 runs scored (103)
 #1 on-base percentage (.456)
 #1 slugging percentage (.657)

Wally Schang
 #2 on-base percentage (.436)

References

External links
1919 Boston Red Sox team page at Baseball Reference
1919 Boston Red Sox season at baseball-almanac.com

Boston Red Sox seasons
Boston Red Sox
Boston Red Sox
1910s in Boston